Migunov is a Russian masculine surname, its feminine counterpart is Migunova. It may refer to
Petr Migunov (born 1974), Russian opera singer
Yelena Migunova (born 1984), Russian sprinter
Yevgeniy Migunov (1921–2004), Russian artist, animator and cartoonist

Russian-language surnames